Cavalieria is a genus of flies in the family Tachinidae.

Species
Cavalieria genibarbis Villeneuve, 1908

Distribution
Greece, Italy, France, Russia, Azerbaijan.

References

Diptera of Asia
Diptera of Europe
Tachinidae genera
Exoristinae
Taxa named by Joseph Villeneuve de Janti